XF1 may refer to:

Fujifilm XF1, digital compact camera
South African type XF1 tender, steam locomotive tender
The X Factor (British series 1), British TV series
Radio callsign for the Baja California islands of Mexico - see Call signs in Mexico